Blenniinae is one of two subfamilies in the combtooth blenny family Blenniidae, it is the smallest of the two subfamilies in the Blennidae with 16 genera and 95 species.

Genera
The following genera are classifies as belonging to the Blenniinae:

 Adelotremus Smith-Vaniz & Rose, 2012
 Aspidontus Cuvier, 1834
 Blennius Linnaeus, 1758
 Enchelyurus Peters, 1868
 Haptogenys Springer, 1972
 Laiphognathus J.L.B. Smith, 1955
 Meiacanthus Norman, 1944
 Oman Springer, 1985
 Omobranchus Valenciennes, 1836
 Omox Springer, 1972
 Parenchelyurus Springer, 1972
 Petroscirtes Rüppell, 1830
 Phenablennius Springer & Smith-Vaniz, 1972
 Plagiotremus Gill, 1865
 Spaniblennius Bath & Wirtz, 1989
 Xiphasia'' Swainson, 1839

References

 
Blenniidae
Ray-finned fish subfamilies
Taxa named by Constantine Samuel Rafinesque